Karen Johnson may refer to:

Karen Johnson (producer), American television soap opera director, producer, writer, and editor
Karen Johnson (violinist), American violinist
Karen Johnson (politician), Arizona politician
Karen Johnson (sailor) (born 1962), Canadian Olympic sailor
Karen C. Johnson (born 1955), research professor in Medicine, University of Tennessee Health Science Center
Karen B. Johnson (1942–2019), mayor of Schenectady, New York

See also
Karen Johnston, American singer-songwriter better known as Michelle Shocked